Dhiraj Singh Thakur (born on 25 April 1964) is an Indian Judge. Presently, he is a Judge of Bombay High Court. He is former Judge of Jammu & Kashmir and Ladakh High Court.

Career 
He was enrolled as an Advocate on 18 October 1989 with the Bar Council of Delhi and subsequently with the Bar Council of Jammu and Kashmir. He was designated as Senior Advocate in the year 2011. He was elevated as Judge of Jammu & Kashmir and Ladakh High Court on 8 March 2013. He was transferred as Judge of Bombay High Court on 10 June 2022.

References

Indian judges
1964 births
Living people